WKZA (106.9 FM) is a radio station broadcasting a Top 40 (CHR) format. Licensed to Lakewood, New York, United States, the station serves the Jamestown, New York area. The station is currently owned by MediaOne Radio Group.

History
The station originally intended to sign on as WKSQ-FM, as FCC records dated September 5, 2000 indicate. On October 9, 2000, the station changed its call sign to the current WKZA, the call sign made popular by a now-defunct AM station in nearby Kane, Pennsylvania. However, the station did not sign on until late November 2000.

The station's first format was a stunt, airing continuous Christmas music. Soon after, the station "officially" signed on with its format of KISS-FM hit radio, which it has maintained ever since.

As an independently owned station, WKZA sometimes leaned toward hot adult contemporary, thus overlapping and competing against WWSE, the established adult-contemporary station in Jamestown. MediaOne Group, owners of WWSE, purchased WKZA from its owners Cross Country Communications in August 2018, closing on its deal October 31 of that year. With the change, each station received a clear focus: WKZA would serve as a pure top-40 outlet, WWSE would stay with hot adult contemporary, while gold-based soft adult contemporary would move to AM/FM outlet WJTN. WKZA temporary morning host Kyle Lewis was retained in the purchase, moving to afternoons, and Andrew Hill and Noel Blackhall began doing the morning show separate from their afternoon program on sister station WWSE.

Ryan Seacrest hosts the midday shift, Direct from Hollywood and still airs AT40 on the weekend.  The Rendezvous love program airs from 8-10pm each weeknight with Simon Marcel. The station's syndicated programming includes the Top 30 Remix with Hollywood Hamilton and Slow Jams' with R. Dub.

References

External links
Official Website

Jamestown, New York
KZA
Radio stations established in 2000
Contemporary hit radio stations in the United States